Brooke Christa Shields (born May 31, 1965) is an American actress and model. She was initially a child model and gained critical acclaim at age 12 for her leading role in Louis Malle's film Pretty Baby (1978). She continued to model into her late teenage years and starred in several dramas in the 1980s, including The Blue Lagoon (1980), and Franco Zeffirelli's Endless Love (1981).

In 1983, Shields suspended her career as a model to attend Princeton University, where she graduated with a bachelor's degree in Romance languages. In the 1990s, Shields returned to acting and appeared in minor roles in films. She also starred in the NBC sitcoms Suddenly Susan (1996–2000), for which she received two Golden Globe nominations, and Lipstick Jungle (2008–2009). In 2017, Shields returned to NBC with a major recurring role in Law & Order: Special Victims Unit in the show's 19th season. Since 2014, Shields has voiced Beverly Goodman in the Adult Swim animated series Mr. Pickles and its spinoff Momma Named Me Sheriff.

Early life 
Brooke Christa Shields was born in Manhattan, New York, on May 31, 1965, the daughter of actress and model Teri Shields (née Schmon; 1933–2012) and businessman Frank Shields (1941–2003). Her mother was of English, German, Scotch-Irish, and Welsh descent, while her father had English, French, Irish, and Italian ancestry.

According to research by William Addams Reitwiesner, Shields has ancestral links with a number of noble families from Italy, in particular from Genoa and Rome. These are namely (in chronological order of descent from 1355 to 1965) the Gattilusi-Palaiologos-Savoy, Grimaldi, Imperiali, Carafa, Doria, Doria-Pamphili-Landi, Chigi-Albani, and Torlonia dynasties. Her paternal grandmother was Italian noblewoman Marina Torlonia di Civitella-Cesi, who was the daughter of an Italian prince and an American socialite. Her great-uncle was the Italian nobleman Alessandro Torlonia, the husband of Infanta Beatriz of Spain.

When Teri announced that she was pregnant, Frank's family paid her a sum to terminate the pregnancy. Teri took the money, but violated the agreement and gave birth to Shields. Frank married Teri, but they were divorced when Shields was five months old. She has two stepbrothers and three half-sisters. When Shields was only five days old, her mother openly stated she wanted her to be active in show business, saying: "She's the most beautiful child and I'm going to help her with her career." Growing up, Shields took piano, ballet, and horse-riding lessons.

Shields was raised in the Roman Catholic faith. For her confirmation at age 10, she took the name Camille, after Camillus de Lellis. While attending high school, she resided in Haworth, New Jersey, across the George Washington Bridge from Manhattan. Shields has stated that her first encounter with the paparazzi was in the Grand Ballroom of the Waldorf Astoria New York at the age of 12, stating that she "stood like a statue wondering why they were all hired to photograph me" and that she "debuted at the Waldorf."

Shields attended the New Lincoln School until eighth grade. She graduated from the Dwight-Englewood School in Englewood, New Jersey, in 1983. She went to Princeton University to pursue her bachelor's degree in French literature, where she graduated in 1987. She was a member of the Princeton Triangle Club and the Cap and Gown Club. Her autobiography, On Your Own, was published in 1985. Her 1987 senior thesis was titled "The Initiation: From Innocence to Experience: The Pre-Adolescent/Adolescent Journey in the Films of Louis Malle, Pretty Baby and Lacombe Lucien."

Shortly after Shields graduated from college, her four-year transcript was published in the July 1987 edition of Life Magazine. Based on that transcript, The New York Times published a light-hearted op-ed piece intended to tweak the claim that Princeton produced superior, well-rounded graduates. Noting that Shields "got all As and Bs, and obviously paid attention to her school work", it claimed she "got cheated" because Princeton did not require her to take any classical studies, medieval, modern or American history, nor any course in mathematics, philosophy, economics, political science, world literature, or science with laboratory experience. "[I]f that adds up to a liberal arts education from a place like Princeton, there is no longer any danger that our society will ever suffer from elitism in any form."

Career

Early work 

Shields began her career as a model when she was 11 months old in 1966. Her first job was for Ivory Soap, when she was photographed by Francesco Scavullo. She continued as a successful child model with model agent Eileen Ford, who, in her Lifetime biography, stated that she started her children's division just for Shields. Shields worked with director Woody Allen in his 1977 film Annie Hall, but her role was cut out of the final edit of the film. In 1978, when she was 12 years old, Shields played a child prostitute in the controversial film Pretty Baby. Eileen Ford, founder of the Ford Modeling Agency, said of Brooke Shields: "She is a professional child and unique. She looks like an adult and thinks like one."

In 1980, 14-year-old Shields was the youngest fashion model ever to appear on the cover of Vogue. Later that same year, Shields appeared in controversial print and TV ads for Calvin Klein jeans. The TV ad included her saying the famous tagline: "You want to know what comes between me and my Calvins? Nothing." Brooke Shields ads would help catapult Klein's career to super-designer status.

From 1981 to 1983, Shields, her mother, photographer Garry Gross, and Playboy Press were involved in litigation in the New York City Courts over the rights to photographs her mother had signed away to Gross (when dealing with models who are minors, a parent or legal guardian must sign such a release form while other agreements are subject to negotiation). Gross was the photographer of a controversial set of nude images taken in 1975 of a then ten-year-old Brooke Shields with the consent of her mother, Teri Shields, for the Playboy Press publication Sugar 'n' Spice. The images portray Shields nude, standing and sitting in a bathtub, wearing makeup and covered in oil.  The courts ruled in favor of the photographer due to a strange twist in New York law. It would have been otherwise had Brooke Shields been considered a child "performer" rather than a model.

By the age of 16, Shields had become one of the most recognizable faces in the United States, because of her dual career as a provocative fashion model and child actress. Time magazine reported in its February 9, 1981, cover story that her day rate as a model was $10,000. In 1983, Shields appeared on the cover of the September issue of Paris Vogue, the October and November issues of American Vogue and the December edition of Italian Vogue. During that period Shields became a regular at New York City's nightclub Studio 54. In 2009, a picture of a naked Brooke Shields taken when she was 10 and included in a work by Richard Prince, Spiritual America, created a stir. It was removed from an exhibition at the Tate Modern after a warning from the police.

Film 

Shields's first major film role was as a lead actress in Louis Malle's Pretty Baby (1978), a movie in which she played a child named Violet who lived in a brothel (in which there were numerous nude scenes). She was only 12 years old when the film was released, and controversy regarding child pornography arose. This was followed by a slightly less controversial and less notable film, Wanda Nevada (1979).

After two decades of movies, her best known films are still arguably The Blue Lagoon (1980), which included nude scenes between teenage lovers on a tropical island (Shields later testified before a U.S. Congressional inquiry that older body doubles were used in some of them), and Endless Love (1981). The MPAA initially rated Endless Love with an X rating. The film was re-edited to earn an R rating. She won the People's Choice Award in the category of Favorite Young Performer in four consecutive years from 1981 to 1984. In 1998, she played a lesbian, Lily, in The Misadventures of Margaret.

In 2001, Lifetime aired the film What Makes a Family, starring Shields and Cherry Jones in a true story of a lesbian couple who fought the adoption laws of Florida.

Television appearances 
Shields began her television career at an early age. In 1980, she was the youngest guest star to ever appear on The Muppet Show, in which she and the Muppets put on their own version of Alice's Adventures in Wonderland. She was also the youngest person to host ABC's Fridays, a Saturday Night Live-like sketch comedy show, in 1981. In one episode of the popular comedy sitcom Friends, Shields played Joey's stalker. This role led directly to her being cast in the NBC sitcom Suddenly Susan, in which she starred from 1996 until 2000, and which earned a People's Choice Award in the category of Favorite Female Performer in a New Television Series for her, in 1997, and two Golden Globe nominations.

In the early 1980s, she starred in the USPHS PSA sponsored by the American Lung Association as an initiative that VIPs should become examples and advocates of non-smoking. In the mid-1980s, Brooke began her support of the USO by touring with Bob Hope.

Shields made a couple of guest appearances on That '70s Show. She played Pam Burkhart, Jackie's (Mila Kunis) mother, who later was briefly involved with Donna's (Laura Prepon) father (played by Don Stark). Shields left That '70s Show when her character was written out. Shields recorded the narration for the Sony/BMG recording of The Runaway Bunny, a concerto for violin, orchestra, and reader, by Glen Roven. It was performed by the Royal Philharmonic and Ittai Shapira.

In 1993, she made a guest appearance in a Season 4 episode of The Simpsons, called "The Front."

In the late 2000s, Shields guest-starred on shows like FX's Nip/Tuck and CBS' Two and a Half Men. In 2005, Shields appeared in a season-two episode of HBO's Entourage, entitled "Blue Balls Lagoon." In 2007, she made a guest appearance on Disney's Hannah Montana, playing Susan Stewart, Miley and Jackson's mother, who died in 2004. In 2008, she returned in the primetime drama Lipstick Jungle. The series ended a year later.

Starting in 2010, she made guest appearances on The Middle as the mother of a brood of terror-inducing children and the nemesis of Frankie Heck (played by Patricia Heaton). She also appeared as a featured celebrity in NBC's genealogy documentary reality series, Who Do You Think You Are?, where it was revealed that, through her father's ancestry, she is the distant cousin (many generations removed) of King Louis XIV of France, and thus a descendant of both Saint Louis and Henry IV of France.

Starting in 2013, Shields has been an occasional guest co-host in the 9:00 hour of Today on NBC. She also recurred during Season Nineteen of Law & Order: Special Victims Unit as Sheila Porter, the grandmother of Olivia Benson's adopted son, Noah Porter.

Theater 
Shields has appeared in several Broadway musical theater productions. She played Rizzo in the 1994 revival of Grease. For four months, beginning July 2001, she played Sally Bowles in the long-running 1998 revival of Cabaret. In September 2004, Shields replaced Donna Murphy in the role of Ruth Sherwood in the 2003 revival of Wonderful Town until the show closed four months later. Her performance was widely praised. Ben Brantley of The New York Times praised the "goofy sweetness" she brought to her interpretation of the role, but wrote that she fell short of Donna Murphy's "perfection." In April 2005, Shields played Roxie Hart in a long-running production of Chicago at the Adelphi Theatre in London's West End. Later the same year, she reprised the role in the Broadway revival, from September 9 to October 30. This made her the first performer to have starred in Chicago, Cabaret, and Grease on Broadway, three long-running revivals noted for "stunt casting" of celebrities not known for musical theatre. She took over the role of Morticia Addams in the Broadway musical The Addams Family on June 28, 2011.

Other media
In 2006, Shields wrote Down Came the Rain: My Journey Through Postpartum Depression and in 2015 she published There Was a Little Girl about the relationship she had with her mother. In 2022, she launched a podcast called Now What? focusing on how people respond to adversity.

Personal life 

As a child, she lived with her mother on the Upper East Side.

In the June 2009 issue of Health magazine, Shields related that she lost her virginity at age 22 to actor Dean Cain while they were dating at Princeton. She said it would have occurred earlier had she had a better self-image.

In the 1990s, Shields promoted physical fitness as an extension of femininity, maintaining that femininity and athletics are compatible.

Despite coming out against the fur industry in 1989, Shields later went on to create her own mink fur coat at Kopenhagen Fur.

Shields has been married twice. From 1997 to 1999, she was married to tennis player Andre Agassi; the couple had been together since 1993. Following her divorce from Agassi, she married television writer Chris Henchy in 2001, after they had met through common friends in 1999. They have two daughters and live in Greenwich Village, New York City.

She is a spokeswoman for Tupperware's Chain of Confidence SMART Girls campaign, a program that teaches girls to nurture their mental and physical well-being.

Postpartum depression
Between April and May 2005, Shields spoke to magazines (such as Guideposts) and appeared on The Oprah Winfrey Show to publicize her battle with postpartum depression, an experience that included depression, thoughts of suicide, an inability to respond to her baby's needs and delayed maternal bonding. Her book, Down Came the Rain, discusses her experience, contributing to a greater public awareness of postpartum depression.

In May 2005, actor Tom Cruisea Scientologist whose beliefs frown upon psychiatrycondemned Shields, both personally and professionally, for using and speaking in favor of the antidepressant drug Paxil. As Cruise said, "Here is a woman and I care about Brooke Shields, because I think she is an incredibly talented woman, you look at [and think], where has her career gone?" Shields responded that Cruise's remarks on antidepressants were "irresponsible" and "dangerous". She also argued that he should "stick to fighting aliens" (a reference to Cruise's role in War of the Worlds as well as some of the more esoteric aspects of Scientology doctrine and teachings), "and let mothers decide the best way to treat postpartum depression." Shields responded to a further attack by Cruise with an op-ed titled "War of Words", published in The New York Times on July 1, 2005, in which she made an individual case for the medication and stated: "In a strange way, it was comforting to me when my obstetrician told me that my feelings of extreme despair and my suicidal thoughts were directly tied to a biochemical shift in my body. Once we admit that postpartum is a serious medical condition, then the treatment becomes more available and socially acceptable. With a doctor's care, I have since tapered off the medication but, without it, I wouldn't have become the loving parent I am today." On August 31, 2006, according to USA Today, Cruise apologized in person to Shields for the incident; she accepted the apology, saying it was "heartfelt". That November, she and her husband attended Cruise's wedding to Katie Holmes.

Relationship with Michael Jackson 
On July 7, 2009, Shields spoke at the memorial service for Michael Jackson. She stated in that speech that she first met Jackson when she was 13 years old, and the two instantly became friends. Shields said:

In her eulogy, she shared anecdotes, including an occasion in which she was his date for one of Elizabeth Taylor's weddings, and the pair sneaked into Taylor's room to get the first look at her dress, only to discover Taylor asleep in the bed. Shields gave a tearful speech, referring to the many memories she and Jackson shared and briefly joked about his famous sequin glove. She also mentioned Jackson's favorite song "Smile" by Charlie Chaplin, which was later sung in the memorial service by Jermaine Jackson.

Jackson stated in his 1993 interview with Oprah Winfrey that he was dating Shields at the time. Shields has stated that Jackson asked her to marry him numerous times and to adopt a child together.

In a conversation with Rabbi Shmuley Boteach in 2001, Jackson said of Shields:

Filmography

Film

Television

Awards and nominations 
Golden Globe Awards

Golden Raspberry Awards

Satellite Awards

Published works

References

External links 

 
 Brooke Shields at Turner Classic Movies
 
 
 WebMD article on Brooke Shields and Postpartum Depression
 "Regarding Ardy": an online short film with Brooke Shields
 "The Runaway Bunny" violin concerto, by Glen Roven and narrated by Brooke Shields 
 Brooke Shields 2007 Interview on Sidewalks Entertainment
 Brooke Shields 2007 short film on Funny Or Die

1965 births
Living people
20th-century American actresses
20th-century American non-fiction writers
20th-century American women writers
21st-century American actresses
21st-century American non-fiction writers
21st-century American women writers
Actresses from New Jersey
Actresses from New York City
American child actresses
American child models
American female models
American children's writers
Female models from New York (state)
American film actresses
American memoirists
American musical theatre actresses
American people of English descent
American people of French descent
American people of German descent
American people of Irish descent
American people of Scotch-Irish descent
American people of Welsh descent
American soap opera actresses
American socialites
American stage actresses
American television actresses
American writers of Italian descent
Dwight-Englewood School alumni
House of Torlonia
People from Haworth, New Jersey
People from Greenwich Village
Princeton University alumni
American women memoirists
American women children's writers
Writers from New Jersey
Catholics from New York (state)
Catholics from New Jersey
People from the Upper East Side
Writers from Manhattan
United Service Organizations entertainers